The Piano Sonata No. 11 in A major, K. 331 / 300i, by Wolfgang Amadeus Mozart is a piano sonata in three movements. 

The sonata was published by Artaria in 1784, alongside Nos. 10 and 12 (K. 330 and K. 332).

The third movement of this sonata, the "Rondo alla Turca", or "Turkish March", is often heard on its own and regarded as one of Mozart's best-known piano pieces.

Structure
The sonata consists of three movements:

All of the movements are in the key of A major or A minor; therefore, the work is homotonal. A typical performance of this entire sonata takes about 20 minutes.

I. Andante grazioso

Since the opening movement of this sonata is a theme and variation, Mozart defied the convention of beginning a sonata with an allegro movement in sonata form. The theme is a siciliana, consisting of two 8-measure sections, each repeated, a structure shared by each variation.

II. Menuetto

The second movement of the sonata is a standard minuet and trio movement in A major.

III. Alla turca

The last movement, marked Alla turca, popularly known as the "Turkish Rondo" or "Turkish March", is often heard on its own and is one of Mozart's best-known piano pieces.

Mozart himself titled the rondo "Alla turca". It imitates the sound of Turkish Janissary bands, the music of which was much in vogue at that time.

Section A: This section, in A minor, consists of a rising sixteenth-note melody followed by a falling eighth note melody over a staccato eighth-note accompaniment. It is eight measures long.
Section B: This section introduces new material in a melody in thirds and eighth notes before varying the A section with a crescendo before falling back to piano by a modification of Section A.
Section C: A forte march in octaves over an arpeggiated chord accompaniment. The key changes to A major.
Section D: A piano continuous sixteenth note melody over a broken-chord accompaniment. This section is in the relative key, F minor.
Section E: A forte scale-like theme followed by a modification of section D.
Coda: A forte theme consisting mostly of chords (arpeggiated and not) and octaves. There is a brief piano restatement of the theme in the middle of the coda. The movement ends with alternating A  octaves followed by two A-major chords.

Relationships to later compositions and arrangements
The theme of the first movement was used by Max Reger in his Variations and Fugue on a Theme by Mozart (1914) for orchestra. Dave Brubeck's "Blue Rondo à la Turk" (1959) is not based on or related to the last movement.  

Pianist Arcadi Volodos arranged a virtuoso piano solo paraphrase, loosely-built from keyparts of the Sonata.

Folk metal band Ulytau published a metal version of the Rondo alla Turca in 2009.

There are also plentiful adaptations for chamber size ensembles; as the arrangement of the Andante Grazioso for string quartet and guitar from the German composer Frederic Bernard.

2014 autograph discovery
In 2014, Hungarian librarian Balázs Mikusi discovered four pages of Mozart's original score (autograph) of the sonata in Budapest's National Széchényi Library. Until then, only the last page of the autograph had been known to have survived. The paper and handwriting of the four pages matched that of the final page of the score, held in Salzburg. The original score is close to the first edition, published in 1784.

In the first movement, however, in bars 5 and 6 of the fifth variation, the rhythm of the last three notes was altered. In the menuetto, the last quarter beat of bar 3 is a C in most editions, but in the original autograph an A is printed. In the first edition, an A is also printed in bar 3, as in the original, but on the other hand a C is printed in the parallel passage at bar 33, mirroring subsequent editions.

In September 2014, Zoltán Kocsis gave the first performance of the rediscovered score.

References

External links

 
  (Alte Mozart-Ausgabe version)
 
 Free scores of the Piano Sonata No. 11 at Mutopia Project
 
 , Daniel Barenboim

Piano Sonata 11
1783 compositions
Compositions in A major
Variations